Sabita Singh is an American lawyer and Judge of the Massachusetts Appeals Court.

On Oct. 25, 2006, the then Republican Massachusetts Governor Mitt Romney nominated Singh to be Judge of the Concord District Court. Her nomination was confirmed on November 15 by the eight-man Governor's Council. She was succeeded by Tejal R. Mehta in February 2018. In May 2017, Republican governor Charlie Baker nominated Singh to the Massachusetts Appeals Court and she was unanimously confirmed as an associate justice by the Governor's Council on June 21, 2017.

Born in Bihar,  Singh came to the US as a child with her family and was brought up in Pennsylvania. She is an alumna of Pennsylvania State University, where she received her Bachelor's Degree in the Administration of Justice in 1987, and of Boston University School of Law, where she received her J.D. degree in 1990.

Singh worked an attorney specializing in white collar criminal defense and business regulation in the White Collar Crime and Business Regulation Group at Bingham McCutchen LLP. She served as Assistant District Attorney for Middlesex County, and then as a Special Counsel for Criminal Rights Enforcement in the Office of the U.S. Attorney in Boston.  As a prosecutor for the U.S. Attorney's office, she focused on human trafficking cases.

Sabita Singh is a Past President of the North American South Asian Bar Association ("NASABA"), an organization of attorneys in the U.S. and Canada who originate from India, Pakistan, Bangladesh, Sri Lanka and other nations on the Indian subcontinent.

See also
List of Asian American jurists
List of first women lawyers and judges in Massachusetts

References

External links
 Interview with Sabita Singh
 Video of Singh at awards party
 Harvard Law Bulletin, 2011

Year of birth missing (living people)
Living people
20th-century American lawyers
21st-century American judges
21st-century American lawyers
American politicians of Indian descent
20th-century American women lawyers
Boston University School of Law alumni
Indian emigrants to the United States
Massachusetts state court judges
Pennsylvania State University alumni
People from Bihar
People from Saran district
Women in Massachusetts politics
People from Somerville, Massachusetts
21st-century American women judges
Asian conservatism in the United States